Niente di Personale (known also with the acronym NDP) is an Italian television talk show hosted by the Italian journalist Antonello Piroso and is broadcast on La7 since 2003.

Telecom Italia Media
Italian television talk shows
Current affairs shows
2003 Italian television series debuts1
La7 original programming